Hadrosaurichnoides is a controversial Early Cretaceous ichnogenus of dinosaur footprint erected by . The original description attributed the ichnogenus to an ornithopod trackmaker, but in 2001 Lockley and Wright argued that they were actually left by theropods because the prints were longer and narrower than would be expected for ornithopod tracks.

Footnotes

References
 Lockley, M. G., and Wright, J. L., 2001, Trackways of large quadrupedal ornithopods  from the Cretaceous: a review: In: Mesozoic Vertebrate Life, edited by Tanke,  D. H., and Carpenter, K., Indiana University Press, p. 428-442.

Dinosaur trace fossils